R. Donnelley may refer to:
 RR Donnelley, publishing company founded 1864 
 R. H. Donnelley, publishing company founded 1886 and succeeded by Dex One